Mount Logan is located in the Lewis Range, Glacier National Park in the U.S. state of Montana. Logan Glacier is immediately north of Mount Logan and Red Eagle Glacier lies to the east. Mount Logan is situated along the Continental Divide.

See also
 Mountains and mountain ranges of Glacier National Park (U.S.)

References

Mountains of Flathead County, Montana
Mountains of Glacier County, Montana
Mountains of Glacier National Park (U.S.)
Lewis Range
Mountains of Montana